The 2009–2010 Israel Football League season was the third season of the Israel Football League (IFL). This season featured two expansion teams (Beersheva Black Swarm and Judean Rebels) and concluded with the Tel Aviv-Jaffa Sabres defeating the Jerusalem Lions, 26–22, in Israel Bowl III.

Regular season 
The regular season began in October 2009 and consisted of a ten game schedule. The top six teams made the playoffs, with the top two seeds receiving a first round bye for the playoffs.

Playoffs 
The Wild Card Round saw the Rebels defeat the Underdogs and the Lions defeat the Pioneers. In the Semifinals, the Sabres crushed the Rebels 70–30 while the Lions also picked up a huge win with their 50–6 upset of the Kings. Israel Bowl III took place on March 26, 2010 before a nationally televised audience, with the Sabres defeating the Lions 26–22 and Evan Reshef earning Israel Bowl MVP.

  * Indicates overtime victory

Awards 

 Most Valuable Player: Jon Rubin, RB, Jerusalem Kings
Offensive Player of the Year: Joe Martisius, QB, Judean Rebels
Coach of the Year: Jon Sharon, Tel Aviv-Jaffa Sabres

References 

Israel Football League Seasons